Jonathan Bomarito (born January 23, 1982) is an American professional racing driver from Monterey, California.

After much success in karting and two years driving in Grand-Am Cup, Jonathan Bomarito moved to Formula Ford 2000 USA in 2003 and won the championship. The next year he moved to the Atlantic Championship and finished 9th in points. The following year he captured his first series win and finished 5th in the championship. 2007 saw him finishing 5th again, winning at San Jose. In 2008, he was the Atlantic Series runner-up, capturing 3 victories. He also competed in the 24 Hours of Daytona in 2005, 2008 and 2009.

In 2010, Bomarito was regular driver of the Grand-Am Rolex Sports Car Series driving a Mazda RX-8's GT class. He achieved two wins (including a class win at the 24 Hours of Daytona) and five podiums, finishing fourth in the championship. Bomarito finished fifth in the standings in the GT class Drivers' championship in 2011 and 2012, with one win and four podiums in both seasons. He also completed the 2012 Petit Le Mans with a Dodge Viper GTS.

In 2013, Bomarito became SRT Motorsports' official driver in the American Le Mans Series. In a SRT Viper GTS-R and with Kuno Wittmer as co-driver scored two podiums, finishing 13th in the Drivers' Championship GT class. They also contested the 24 Hours of Le Mans with Tommy Kendall as third driver, finishing ninth in class. Bomarito and Wittmer remained as co-drivers in the team in the new United SportsCar Championship in 2014, scoring two victories at Indianapolis and Austin. They entered the final round tied on points with Antonio García of Corvette Racing, so SRT elected to split the two drivers across both their cars in order to maximise the marque's chance of winning the GTLM drivers' title. The strategy worked but it was Wittmer who finished ahead, placing Bomarito second in the standings.

For 2015 he re-signed with Mazda to drive in the prototype class. Results were initially modest until Joest Racing took over the management of the team ahead of the introduction of DPi regulations for 2018. Joest elected to withdraw from the final races of the 2017 season in order to maximise testing time for the following season. Save for a few reliability issues in early 2018, Bomarito and the team have since enjoyed a very successful period, winning four races with co-driver Harry Tincknell including the 2020 12 Hours of Sebring and finishing third overall in the 2020 WeatherTech SportsCar Championship.

Complete motorsports results

American Open-Wheel racing results
(key) (Races in bold indicate pole position, races in italics indicate fastest race lap)

USF2000 National Championship

Star Mazda Championship

Atlantic Championship

Indy Lights

24 Hours of Le Mans results

WeatherTech SportsCar Championship results
(key)(Races in bold indicate pole position. Races in italics indicate fastest race lap in class. Results are overall/class)

References

External links
Atlantic Championship bio

1982 births
Living people
Atlantic Championship drivers
Indy Lights drivers
Sportspeople from Monterey, California
24 Hours of Daytona drivers
Indy Pro 2000 Championship drivers
Racing drivers from California
Rolex Sports Car Series drivers
American Le Mans Series drivers
24 Hours of Le Mans drivers
FIA World Endurance Championship drivers
WeatherTech SportsCar Championship drivers
U.S. F2000 National Championship drivers
12 Hours of Sebring drivers
Multimatic Motorsports drivers
Chip Ganassi Racing drivers
Team Joest drivers
US RaceTronics drivers